The  is an archaeological site in what is now part of the city of Hachinohe, Aomori Prefecture, in the Tōhoku region of northern Japan, with an initial  Jōmon period shell midden.  The site was designated a National Historic Site of Japan in 1981 by the Japanese government.

Overview
During the initial Jōmon period (approximately 7000 years ago), sea levels were some three meters higher than at present, and the ambient temperature was also 2 deg C higher. During this period, the Tōhoku region was inhabited by the Jōmon people, many of whom lived in coastal settlements.  The middens associated with such settlements contain bone, botanical material, mollusc shells, sherds, lithics, and other artifacts and ecofacts associated with the now-vanished inhabitants, and these features, provide a useful source into the diets and habits of Jōmon society. Most of these middens are found along the Pacific coast of Japan.

The location of the shell midden is on a river terrace on the right bank of the Gonohe River in northern Hachinohe, at an altitude of approximately 10 to 20 meters. The area was first surveyed by the Aomori Prefectural Cultural Heritage Expert Committee in 1958, and excavated extensively from 1977-1979 when the site became endangered by the construction on the nearby Kurono Industrial Park.

The site dates from the initial Jōmon period (7000 BC) and the shell midden consisted of four separate middens with an average thickness of 40-50 centimeters, increasing to 1.1 meter near the remains of dwellings, indicating that the site had been occupied for many centuries, however no remains of pit dwellings have been discovered.

The midden contained the remnants of some 30 varieties of shellfish, bones of nine types of animals, three types of birds, birds and at least 20 different varieties of fish and an extremely large number of Hamaguri shells, indicating the importance of these clams in the early Jōmon period diet. Some of the shellfish in the midden are no longer found in the area, indicating that the ocean temperatures during this period were warmer than at present. The midden also contained shards of Jōmon pottery marked with cord-patterns, as well as stone tools and implements and objects fashioned from bone (fishing hooks, needles, hairpins, etc.).

Some of the fish bones were oceanic species (such as bonito and sea bass), and the presence of combination fish hooks and open socketed harpoon heads indicates that the local inhabitants had the capability of offshore fishing as well as gathering of marine resources from inner bay areas.

Many of the artifacts recovered from the site are on display at the Hachinohe City Museum. There are no public facilities at the site, which has been backfilled and is now located under rice paddies. There is only a billboard with some explanatory text and photographs. It is approximately a 30 minute walk from the Aoimori Railway Mutsu-Ichikawa Station.

The site has been submitted for inscription on the UNESCO World Heritage List as one of the Jōmon Archaeological Sites in Hokkaidō, Northern Tōhoku, and other regions

See also

List of Historic Sites of Japan (Aomori)

References

External links
Jomon Archaeological Sites
Chōshichiyachi Shell Mound Agency for Cultural Affairs 
Hachinohe City Museum site
Aomori Prefectural site 

Archaeological sites in Japan
Jōmon period
Hachinohe
Shell middens in Japan
History of Aomori Prefecture
Historic Sites of Japan